Ballynahinch railway station was on the Midland Great Western Railway (MGWR) Clifden branch line from .

History
Like  the station was not immediately ready when public services started to Clifden on 1 July 1895 and opened a little later. The station served the area of Ballinahinch as well as the local castle, built in 1684 for the Martyn family, which is located there. In the early 1900s it was the summer residence of Ranjitsinhji, the Maharaja of Nawanagar, and former test cricketer  with the English  Cricket Team.

The station closed with the line in 1935,  since being renovated and now a private dwelling.

References

Footnotes

Sources

Further reading
 

Disused railway stations in County Galway
Railway stations opened in 1895
Railway stations closed in 1935